János Varga (21 October 1939 – 29 December 2022) was a Hungarian wrestler and both an Olympic champion and world champion in Greco-Roman wrestling.

Olympics
Varga competed at the 1968 Summer Olympics in Mexico City where he received a gold medal in Greco-Roman wrestling in the bantamweight class.

World championships
Varga won a gold medal in Greco-Roman wrestling at the 1963 FILA Wrestling World Championships, and again a gold medal in 1970. He received a silver medal in 1967, and a bronze medal in 1971.

Varga received a silver medal in Freestyle wrestling at the 1961 FILA Wrestling World Championships and a bronze medal at the 1962 FILA Wrestling World Championships.

References

External links

1939 births
2022 deaths
Olympic wrestlers of Hungary
Wrestlers at the 1964 Summer Olympics
Wrestlers at the 1968 Summer Olympics
Wrestlers at the 1972 Summer Olympics
Hungarian male sport wrestlers
Olympic gold medalists for Hungary
Olympic medalists in wrestling
Medalists at the 1968 Summer Olympics
20th-century Hungarian people
Sportspeople from Pest County
People from Abony